Christianity is a minority religion in Muslim-majority Somalia, with an estimated 1,000 practitioners in a population of over 10 million inhabitants. Although early Christian Orthodoxy was practised by ethnic Somalis prior to Islam, most modern-day Christian adherents come from the Bantu ethnic minority group, or are descended from Italian colonists and belong to the Evangelical and Wesleyan Church of the Nazarene. There is one Catholic diocese for the entire country, the Diocese of Mogadishu.

Orthodox Christianity came to coastal areas of the Somalia in early 2nd and 3rd century, by way of the Ethiopian expansion of East Africa. , there are at least some known local Christians in Somaliland.

History
Due to the proximity of Somalis to the Axumite and Southern Arabian Cultures, early Christianity and Judaism was professed by some in the region as can be seen by inscriptions, gravesites with stone crosses, and codices in the Ge’ez script. However, the advent of Islam in the region saw an end to Christianity, not making a return until Italian colonisation. 

The Diocese of Mogadishu estimates that there were about 100 Roman Catholic practitioners in Somalia in 2004. This was down from a high of 8,500 adherents at the start of the trusteeship period in 1950, under the Prefecture Apostolic of Benadir of the Vicariate Apostolic of Mogadiscio.

Thirty-seven years earlier, in 1913, during the early part of the colonial era, there were virtually no Christians in the Somali territories. Around 100–200 followers existed in the schools and orphanages of the few Catholic missions in the British Somaliland protectorate. No Catholic missions are known to have existed in Italian Somaliland during the same period.

However, after World War I Catholicism started to be promoted in "Somalia italiana", as Listowel wrote:

In 1928, a Catholic cathedral was built in Mogadishu by order of Cesare Maria De Vecchi, a Catholic governor of "Somalia italiana" who promoted the "Missionari della Consolata" Christianization of Somali people. The cathedral, the biggest in Africa in the 1920s and 1930s, was later damaged during the civil war that began in the 1980s.

The Bishop of Mogadishu, Franco Filippini, declared in 1940 that there were about 40,000 Somali Catholics due to the work of missionaries in the rural regions of Juba and Shebelle, but World War II damaged in an irreversible way most of the Catholic missions in Italian Somalia. Most were Somali Bantu, but some thousands were illegitimate sons of Italian soldiers and Somalian girls (who received Italian citizenship when baptized).

The Bible was first translated into Somali only in 1979.

According to the World Christian Encyclopedia, the Somalia Believers Fellowship, the Somalia Mennonite Mission and the Seventh-day Adventists are present in this country. Somalia is included in the Episcopal Area of the Horn of Africa of the Anglican Diocese of Egypt, though there are no current local congregations. The Adventist Mission indicates that there are no Adventist members in Somalia, and that Christianity in general has seen little growth there.

Persecution
Due to the ongoing civil war in the southern part of the country, professing Christians in Somalia have faced persecution and sometimes death. Somalia is number three on Open Doors’ 2022 World Watch List, an annual ranking of the 50 countries where Christians face the most extreme persecution.   Apart from Mogadishu Cathedral (which is no longer used for Christian services, although in 2013 plans to repair it were announced by the Diocese of Mogadiscio), there are no church buildings in the country. Nor is there any legal protection for Christians, some of whom meet in underground churches.

Paramilitary groups in Somalia have also engaged in widespread looting of Christian graves, in addition to the desecration of Sufi Muslim graves and mosques. Sometimes the term "Christian" was a label that the jihadists would affix on people they suspected of working for Ethiopian intelligence.

In August 2009, International Christian Concern reported that four Christians working to help orphans in Somalia were beheaded by Islamist extremists when they refused to convert to Islam.

In December 2013, the Ministry of Justice and Religious Affairs released a directive prohibiting the celebration of Christian festivities in the country.

See also

Religion in Somalia
Mogadishu Cathedral

Notes

External links
Catholic Church in Somalia

 
Persecution of Christians by Muslims